Torbeyevo is the name of several inhabited localities in Russia:
Torbeyevo, Republic of Mordovia, an urban-type settlement in the Republic of Mordovia
Torbeyevo, Smolensk Oblast, a rural locality (a village) in Smolensk Oblast
Torbeyevo, name of several other rural localities